The highest-selling compact discs and music downloads in Mexico are ranked in the Top 100 Mexico record chart published weekly by AMPROFON (Asociación Mexicana de Productores de Fonogramas y Videogramas), a non-profit organization made up of Mexican and multinational record companies.

In 2009, 20 albums reached number one on the chart, including Primera Fila, a live album recorded by Vicente Fernández that spent seven non-consecutive weeks at the top, and won the Latin Grammy Award for Best Ranchero Album. Lines, Vines and Trying Times by Jonas Brothers and No Line on the Horizon by U2 peaked at number one in the Billboard 200 in the United States and also reached the top position of the Mexican chart. Shakira's seventh studio album Loba debuted at number one and was certified platinum in the first week of sales.

Wisin & Yandel and Alejandro Fernández released the most number one albums of the year with two each. Fernández released the compilation album De Noche: Clásicos a Mi Manera and the double album Dos Mundos. Dos Mundos includes Evolución, a pop music album, and Tradición, a ranchera music album; both albums debuted at the top two spots on this chart, and also in the Billboard Top Latin Albums chart in the United States. Thalía also peaked at the top of the chart with her first live album Primera Fila. The album is her first release with Sony Music Latin after 10 years signed with EMI, and features the singer performing with a 12-piece band.

Thriller 25, the 25th anniversary special-edition reissue of the album recorded by the American singer Michael Jackson in 1982, also reached number one after the singer's death on June 25, with the album also peaking at the top of the American digital sales charts. Madonna's third compilation album Celebration earned the top spot of the chart and received a platinum certification in México for sales of over 80,000 units. The soundtrack for the Mexican soap opera Atrévete a Soñar became the best-selling album of the year in the country.

Albums

See also
List of number-one songs of 2009 (Mexico)

References

Mexico
Number-one albums
2009